This is a list of artists that are, or once were, signed to Polydor Records.



0-9

 10cc
 2Pac (Polydor UK)
 220 Kid
 4 Runner (Polydor Nashville)
 +44 (Polydor UK)
 50 Cent (Polydor UK)
 The 1975 (Polydor UK / Dirty Hit)

A

 ABBA
Absent Minded (Polydor UK)
 Bryan Adams
 AFI (Polydor UK)
 Abd al Malik
 Ace of Base
 A-ha
 A II Z (Polydor UK)
 Alizée
 Alphabeat
 Alphaville
 Alpines
 Alquin
 The All-American Rejects (Polydor UK)
 The Allman Brothers Band
 María Conchita Alonso
 All Time Low (Polydor UK)
 The Amboy Dukes
 Thomas Anders
 Jon Anderson
 Angels and Airwaves (Polydor UK)
 Die Antwoord (Polydor UK)
 Paul Anka
 Army of Lovers (Polydor UK)
 Art of Noise (China/Polydor)
 Appleton
 Asia
 Athlete (Polydor UK)
 Atlanta Rhythm Section
 Audience
 Audioslave (Polydor UK, shared with Sony Music Entertainment)
 The Automatic
 Roy Ayers
 Ayọ
 Intan Ayu (Polydor Bandung)

B

 Tony Banks (Charisma/Polydor) (US/Canada)
 Barclay James Harvest
 Gary Barlow
 Daniel Bedingfield (Polydor UK)
 The Bees
 Bee Gees (Polydor UK)
 Belters_Only
 The Big Three
 Björk (outside the UK and Iceland)
 Black Tide (Polydor UK)
 BLACKPINK (Polydor UK)
 Blind Faith
 Blink-182 (Polydor UK)
 Blossom Toes
 Boyzone
 Brand New (Polydor UK)
 Brick and Lace
 Alicia Bridges
 Bright Eyes (Polydor UK)
 Sarah Brightman
 James Brown
 Ian Brown
 Miquel Brown
 Roy Buchanan
 Buckingham Nicks (outside Canada)
 Bucks Fizz
 Bully Buhlan

C

 Café Tacvba (UK) (Universal Music Latin)
 Cast
 Cat's Eyes
 Cat Mother and the All Night News Boys
 Celeste (Polydor UK)
 The Chakachas
 Chapel Club
 Chelsia Chan (Polydor Hong Kong)
 Cheryl Cole (Fascination/Polydor)
 Chris Cornell (Polydor UK)
 Christine Fan (Polydor France)
 Clare Maguire
 Claire Waldoff
 Cover Drive
 Eric Clapton (RSO/Bushbranch/Polydor)
 Petula Clark
 Stanley Clarke
 Lloyd Cole and the Commotions
 Amie Comeaux (Polydor Nashville)
 Commodores
 Billy Connolly
 Jodie Connor
Crawlers
 Cream
 Celia Cruz
 Cookie Crew
 Crystal Castles
 Courteeners
 The Cure (Fiction/Polydor) (outside US/Canada)

D

 D Mob
 Daley
 Dashboard Confessional (Polydor UK)
 Davis Daniel (Polydor Nashville)
 Bill Deal
 Esmee Denters (Polydor UK)
 Deep Purple (outside US)
Lana Del Rey (Polydor UK)
 Delays
 Delphic
 Demi Lovato (Polydor UK/Fascination)
 Cathy Dennis
 Destinee & Paris (Polydor UK)
 Lynsey De Paul
 Jim Diamond (PolyGram TV/Polydor)
 Diddy (Polydor UK)
 Dino
 Dirty White Boy
 Alesha Dixon
 Dodgy
 Plácido Domingo
 Donel
 Double
 Dr. Vades 
 Dr. Dre (Polydor UK)
 Duffy (A&M/Polydor) (outside US)
 The Duke Spirit
 Hilary Duff (Polydor UK)
 Durrty Goodz (Polydor UK)

E

 Eagles (Polydor UK)
 Billie Eilish 
 E/Eels (signed directly to Polydor US from 1992 to 1993, Polydor UK later distributed his works with Eels on behalf of DreamWorks Records)
 Elbow (Polydor UK)
 Sophie Ellis-Bextor
 Electric Light Orchestra (Polydor UK)
 Ellie Goulding (Polydor UK)
 Emma Bunton (Polydor UK)
 Emma's Imagination (Polydor UK)
 Emerson Lake & Powell
 Eminem (Polydor UK)
 Engine Alley (Polydor UK)
 Envy & Other Sins (Polydor UK)
 Escape The Fate (Polydor UK)
 Paul Evans

F

 Fairport Convention (debut album)
 Far East Movement (Polydor UK)
 Mylène Farmer  (Polydor France)
 Fat Boys (Tin Pan Apple/Polydor)
 The Fatback Band
 The Fauves (Polydor Australia)
 Feist (Polydor France & UK)
 Fergie (Polydor UK)
 Findlay (Polydor UK)
 Fish (Polydor UK)
Fishmans
 The Flaws
 Flint
 Florence + The Machine
 Flyleaf (Polydor UK)
 The Fratellis (Polydor UK)
 Friend & Lover (Verve Forecast/Polydor)
 Focus (Polydor UK)
 Frl. Menke

G

 G-Unit (Polydor UK)
 The Game (rapper, Polydor UK)
 Gemma Fox
 Gloria Gaynor
 Rory Gallagher
 Calvin Goldspink
 Joey Gregorash
 Clinton Gregory (Polydor Nashville)
 Gwen Guthrie
 Girls Aloud (Fascination/Polydor)
 Girls' Generation (Polydor France)
 Golden Earring
 Skylar Grey (Polydor UK)
 Greyson Chance (Polydor UK)
 Guillemots
 Gun 
 Guns N' Roses (Polydor UK)

H

 Becky Hill
 Haircut One Hundred
 HAIM (Polydor UK)
 Isaac Hayes
 Helmet (Polydor UK)
 Jimi Hendrix
 Hear'Say
 The Hill
 Molly Hocking (Polydor UK)
 Mark Hollis (Polydor UK)
 Susumu Hirasawa (Polydor K.K.)
 Hollywood Undead (Polydor UK)
 Jake Holmes
 Samuel Hui (Polydor Hong Kong)
 Hundred Reasons

I

 Julio Iglesias
 Yosui Inoue (Polydor Japan)
 INXS (Polydor France)

J

 Janet Jackson (Polydor UK)
 La Toya Jackson
 Millie Jackson
 Jagged Edge (Polydor UK)
 The Jam
 Japanese Voyeurs
 Jagjit Singh
 Jax Jones
 Jean Michel Jarre (Dreyfus/Polydor)
Carly Rae Jepsen (Polydor UK)
 Jesy Nelson
Jimmy Eat World (Polydor UK)
 Joe Jonas (Polydor UK)
 Joe Junior (Polydor Hong Kong)
 Madeline Juno
 Elton John (US & Canada, 1990–95)
 The Jolt 
 Jon and Vangelis
 Jonas Brothers (Polydor UK)
 Juanes (UK) (Universal Music Latin)
 Juice WRLD
 Julia Michaels (UK)

K

 K'Naan (Polydor UK)
 Ronan Keating
 Toby Keith (Polydor Nashville)
 The Kelly Family
 Michael Patrick "Paddy" Kelly
 Kingdom Come
 Kitaro
 Klaxons
 Kristian Leontiou
 Kaiser Chiefs
 Kelis (Polydor UK)
 Kenny Bee (Polydor Hong Kong)
 King Crimson (E.G./Polydor)

L

 L.A. Guns
 Lake (Germany)
 Lady Gaga (Polydor UK)
 Lawson (Polydor UK)
 Lale Andersen
 Lara Fabian
 Larissa Mondrus (Polydor Germany)
 Denny Laine
 LANY
 James Last
 Led Zeppelin (Atlantic/Polydor UK, 1969–71, switched to WEA distribution afterward)
 Lee Mead (Fascination/Polydor)
 Lena (Polydor Germany)
 John Lennon
 Leslie Cheung (Polydor Hong Kong)
 Level 42 (Polydor UK)
 Liam Bailey
 Lighthouse Family
 Lilian Harvey
 Limp Bizkit (Polydor UK)
 Little Angels
 Cher Lloyd (UMG Polydor)
LMFAO (Polydor UK)
 Lolly
 La Roux (Polydor UK)
 LuvBug

M

 Mabel
 Maurizio De Jorio (Polydor UK)
 The Maccabees
 Madeon (Polydor UK)
 Madonna (Polydor UK)
 Maestro Fresh Wes
 Sidney Magal
 Magnum
 Tim Maia
 The Main Ingredient
 Mandrill
 Man Parrish
 Manfred Mann's Earth Band
 Marilyn Manson (Polydor UK)
 Benny Mardones
 Maroon 5 (Polydor UK)
 Melissa Mars
 Masterboy
 Lutricia McNeal
 Medal
 Maximum Balloon (Polydor UK)
 Meiko (Polydor UK)
 M.I.A.
 George Michael (Ægean/Polydor UK)
 Mindless Behavior (Polydor UK)
 Minor Detail
 Missouri
 Modestep
 The Moffatts (Polydor Nashville)
 Monaco
 James Morrison
 Moxy (Polydor of Canada)
 Elliott Murphy
 Keith O'Conner Murphy (with Keith Murphy & The Daze)
 The Moody Blues (Threshold/Polydor)
 Tim Moore
 Samantha Mumba
 Mungo Jerry
 Music for Pleasure
 The Music
 MSTRKRFT
 Mýa (Polydor UK)

N

 The Naked & Famous 
 Nana Mouskouri
 Natalia Kills (Polydor UK)
 Nathan Evans 
 Nelly Furtado (Polydor UK) 
 Nelson (Polydor UK, distribution of DGC/Geffen-era releases) 
 N.E.R.D. (Polydor UK)
 The New Seekers
 Nicola Roberts 
 Nicole Scherzinger (Polydor UK) 
 Paul Nicholas
 Nine Inch Nails (Polydor UK) 
 Nino Bravo 
 Nirvana (Polydor UK) 
 No Angels
 No Doubt (Polydor UK) 
 N-Dubz (left 2008) 
 Nerina Pallot
 Nimco Happy

O

OneRepublic (Polydor UK)
Yoko Ono
Orianthi (Polydor UK)
The Osmonds
Donny Osmond (Kolob/Polydor; transferred from MGM)
Marie Osmond (Kolob/Polydor; transferred from MGM)
Donny & Marie Osmond (Kolob/Polydor; transferred from MGM)
Oskar Joost
Os Mutantes (Polydor Brazil)
Otto Reutter

P

 Papa Roach (Polydor UK)
 Alex Parks
 Paul Godwin
 Peaches & Herb
 Les Penning
 Peter Alexander
 Peter Marsh
 Physical Graffiti
 The Pierces
 The Police (Polydor UK)
 Cole Porter
 Powderfinger
 The Pretty Reckless (Polydor UK)
 Priscilla Chan (Polydor Hong Kong)
 Protocol
 Puddle of Mudd (Polydor UK)
 Pussycat Dolls (Polydor UK)
 P-Model

Q

 Queens of the Stone Age (Polydor UK)
 Quicksand
 Freddy Quinn (Polydor Germany)

R

 Rachel Stevens
 Rainbow (Oyster/Polydor)
 Ramz
 Rare Bird
 Raye (Polydor UK)
 Don Ray
 RD (Ruff Diamondz)
 Reparata
 Return to Forever
 Rev Theory (Polydor UK)
 Ricky Hui (Polydor Hong Kong)
 Rise Against (Polydor UK)
 Rivers Cuomo (Polydor UK)
 Robot Boy
 Romance
 The Rolling Stones
 Rufus Wainwright (Polydor UK)
 Ruti Olajugbagbe

S

 Sad Café
 Saga
 Sam Fender (Polydor UK)
 Samuel Hui (Sam Hui)  (Polydor Hong Kong)
 Saraya
 Stefflon Don (54 London/Quality Control/Polydor UK) 
 The Saturdays (Fascination/Polydor)
 The Savage Rose
 Scars on Broadway (Polydor UK)
 Scissor Sisters
 S Club 7
 S Club 8
 Rudi Schuricke
 Sea Girls (Polydor UK)
 Sea Stories (Polydor Australia)
 Selena Gomez (Polydor UK)
 Semi Precious Weapons (Polydor UK)
 Sensations Fix
 Shane Codd (Polydor UK)
 Shakatak
 Sham 69
 Rocky Sharpe and the Replays
 Neil Sedaka (Polydor UK, Polydor Canada)
 Shed Seven
 Shocking Blue
 Shoes (U.S.-band)
 Shystie
 Siouxsie and the Banshees (original recording label)
 Sky Ferreira (Polydor UK) 
 Slade
 Smiley Culture (Polydor UK)
 Snow Patrol
 Sonic Youth (Polydor UK)
 Soraya
 Soundgarden (Polydor UK)
 Spitz (Polydor Japan)
 Spyro Gyra
 Ringo Starr (Polydor UK)
 Cat Stevens (a.k.a. Yusuf Islam)
 Rachel Stevens
 Gwen Stefani (Polydor UK)
 Street Drum Corps (Polydor UK)
 Amy Studt
 Christina Stürmer
 The Style Council
 Sugababes (the original line-up)
 Swedish House Mafia
 The Sweet
 Sweet Connection

T

 Take That (Polydor UK)
 Talk Talk (Verve/Polydor UK)
 James Taylor Quartet
 Teddy Robin (Polydor Hong Kong)
 Tee-Set
 Ten Wheel Drive
 Teresa Teng
 Tesla (Polydor UK, distribution of Geffen-era releases)
 Theo Lingen
 Therapy? (Polydor UK)
 Tom Jones
 Timbaland (Polydor UK)
 Toots Thielemans
 A Thousand Points of Night
 The Tigers (Polydor Japan)
 Tonic
 Tony Scott
 Tove Lo (Polydor UK)
 Traffic
 Tired Pony
 Truth Hurts (Polydor UK)
 Turbo B
 Totally Enormous Extinct Dinosaurs
 TV on the Radio (Polydor UK)
 TYP
 Taste (Irish band)

U

 U2
 U.K.

V

 Dave Van Ronk
 Vanessa White (Polydor UK)
 Vangelis
 Van Halen (Polydor UK)
 Van Morrison
 The Velvet Underground
 Miklós Vig
 Visage
 Vivian Chow (Polydor Hong Kong)

W

 The Waitresses
 Wale (Polydor UK)
 Albertina Walker (Polydor Gospel Series)
 The Wallflowers (Polydor UK)
 Walk This Way (band) 
 Waterfront
 Marti Webb
 Weezer (Polydor UK)
 Tony Joe White
 White Lies (Polydor UK)
 The Who (original recording label)
 The Wild Magnolias
 Ulla Wiesner (Germany)
 will.i.am (Polydor UK)
 Tony Williams
 Wolfmother
 World Trade
 Patrick Wolf
 Link Wray
 Chely Wright (Polydor Nashville)
 Warning (Polydor France)

X

X-Clan
X Japan
Xutos & Pontapés
Xavion

Y

Yeah Yeah Yeahs
Years & Years
Yelawolf (Polydor UK)
Yngwie Malmsteen
Yuksek

Z

Zucchero

References

 
Polydor Records